Episparis hyalinata is a species of moth in the  family Erebidae.

Distribution
The species is found in Democratic Republic of Congo

References
Holland, 1920. Lepidoptera of the Congo, being a systematic list of the butterflies and moths collected by the American Museum of Natural History Congo Expedition, together with descriptions of some hitherto undescribed species. - Bulletin of the American Museum of Natural History 43:109–369, pls. 6–14.

External links

Pangraptinae